Disgraced! is a 1933 American pre-Code mystery film directed by Erle C. Kenton and written by Francis Martin and Alice D. G. Miller. The film stars Helen Twelvetrees, Bruce Cabot, Adrienne Ames, William Harrigan, Ken Murray, Charles Middleton and Adrienne D'Ambricourt. The film was released on July 7, 1933, by Paramount Pictures.

Cast  
Helen Twelvetrees as Gay Holloway
Bruce Cabot as Kirk Undwood, Jr.
Adrienne Ames as Julia Thorndyke
William Harrigan as Captain Holloway
Ken Murray as Jim McGuire 
Charles Middleton as District Attorn
Adrienne D'Ambricourt as Madame Maxime
Ara Haswell as Miss Peck
Dorothy Bay as Flynn

References

External links 
 

1933 films
American mystery films
1933 mystery films
Paramount Pictures films
Films directed by Erle C. Kenton
American black-and-white films
1930s English-language films
1930s American films